Longquan Town is a town that lies on the eastern side of Mentougou District, Beijing, China. It borders Miaofengshan and Junzhuang Towns to the north, Wulituo and Guangning Subdistricts to the east, Yongding and Tantuo Towns to the south, Yongding and Wangping to the west. In 2020, Longquan had a census population of 52,072.

The name Longquan was given for the town's location near Jiulong Mountain and Yongding River.

History

Administrative Divisions 
As of 2021, Longquan Area consisted of 33 subdivisions, with 16 communities and 17 villages:

See also 

 List of township-level divisions of Beijing

References 

Mentougou District
Towns in Beijing